Discoidin domain receptor family, member 1, also known as DDR1 or CD167a (cluster of differentiation 167a), is a human gene.

Function 

Receptor tyrosine kinases (RTKs) play a key role in the communication of cells with their microenvironment. These molecules are involved in the regulation of cell growth, differentiation and metabolism. The protein encoded by this gene is a RTK that is widely expressed in normal and transformed epithelial cells and is activated by various types of collagen. This protein belongs to a subfamily of tyrosine kinase receptors with a homology region to the Dictyostelium discoideum protein discoidin I in their extracellular domain. Its autophosphorylation is achieved by all collagens so far tested (type I to type VI). A closely related family member is the DDR2 protein.  In situ studies and Northern-blot analysis showed that expression of this encoded protein is restricted to epithelial cells, particularly in the kidney, lung, gastrointestinal tract, and brain. In addition, this protein is significantly over-expressed in several human tumors from breast, ovarian, esophageal, and pediatric brain. This gene is located on chromosome 6p21.3 in proximity to several HLA class I genes. Alternative splicing of this gene results in multiple transcript variants.

References

Further reading 

 
 
 
 
 
 
 
 
 
 
 
 
 
 
 
 
 
 
 
 

Clusters of differentiation
Tyrosine kinase receptors